Yara is a genus of beetles in the family Hydroscaphidae, containing the following species:

 Yara dybasi Reichardt & Hinton, 1976
 Yara vanini Reichardt & Hinton, 1976

References

External links
 Tree of Life entry for Hydroscaphidae, with pictures

Myxophaga genera